Mark Johnston (born August 31, 1979) is a former freestyle swimmer from Canada, who competed at two consecutive Summer Olympic Games, in Sydney, Australia in 2000 and Athens, Greece in 2004. Johnston's consecutive 10-year run on the Canadian national team was longer than any other current swimmer at the time.  Born and raised in St. Catharines, he was named to the national team in 1996 while swimming for Swim Brock Niagara (now Brock Niagara Aquatics).  He went on to win numerous medals on the world stage throughout his career representing Canada at two Commonwealth Games, five World Championships, the Pan-American Games, three Pan-Pacific Aquatic Championships, and several other major international competitions.  He is a 14-time national champion and his best Olympic result was the fifth place in the men's 4x200-metre freestyle relay in Athens, Greece in 2004. He currently works as the regional manager of investment and retirement planning at RBC.

Career Highlights:
 Canadian National Swim Team Member from 1996 to 2005
 14-Time National Champion in the 200, 400 and 1500 Freestyle
 Bronze Medallist at the 1999 and 2002 FINA World Swimming Championships
 Finalist at the 2000 and 2004 Olympic Games
 Silver Medallist at the 2002 Commonwealth Games
 CIS: Canadian Interuniversity Sport Athletic All Canadian
 23 Medals (16 Gold) at the CIS Swimming Championships
 St. Catharines Sports Hall of Fame Inductee, 2017
 University of British Columbia Sports Hall of Fame Inductee, 2015
 Denis Morris High School Hall of Fame Inductee, 2000
 St. Catharines Athlete of the Year, 1999
 Coaching the Vancouver Technical Secondary School swim team in 2021-2022 to great success
 Coaching with Exceleration Multisport
 Designed swim cap for Vancouver Technical Secondary(Best swim team in Vancouver)
 2 time RBC performance convention winner

See also
 List of Commonwealth Games medallists in swimming (men)

References

External links 
 
 
 

1979 births
Living people
Canadian male freestyle swimmers
Medalists at the FINA World Swimming Championships (25 m)
Olympic swimmers of Canada
Swimmers at the 1999 Pan American Games
Swimmers at the 2000 Summer Olympics
Swimmers at the 2004 Summer Olympics
Sportspeople from St. Catharines
UBC Thunderbirds swimmers
Commonwealth Games medallists in swimming
Pan American Games bronze medalists for the United States
Commonwealth Games silver medallists for Canada
Pan American Games medalists in swimming
Swimmers at the 2002 Commonwealth Games
Medalists at the 1999 Pan American Games
Medallists at the 2002 Commonwealth Games